Kamal Riad Noseir (8 January 1912 – before 18 March 1996) was an Egyptian basketball player. He competed in the men's tournament at the 1936 Summer Olympics.

References

External links

1912 births
Year of death missing
Egyptian men's basketball players
Olympic basketball players of Egypt
Basketball players at the 1936 Summer Olympics
Place of birth missing